Mahmudi, or Maḥmūdī, was a fine cotton variety cloth produced in India.

Mentions 
The Ain-i-Akbari mentions the Mahmudi among cotton cloths.

Fabric 
It was a superior quality cloth finer than contemporary varieties such as longcloth. Various sources describe it as muslin. Mahmudi was also used for various embroidery base such as chikan.

See also 
 Khasa (cloth)

References 

Woven fabrics
Mughal clothing